The University of Otago School of Biomedical Sciences (formerly Otago School of Medical Sciences) is one of seven component schools in the University of Otago Division of Health Sciences (which also comprises Otago Medical School; Faculty of Dentistry; School of Pharmacy; School of Physiotherapy; University of Otago, Christchurch; and University of Otago, Wellington).

The School of Biomedical Sciences is based in Dunedin, New Zealand, and comprises five departments:

 Department of Anatomy
 Department of Biochemistry
 Department of Microbiology and Immunology
 Department of Pharmacology and Toxicology
 Department of Physiology

In addition to conducting teaching and research in the above fields, the School of Biomedical Sciences contributes to the teaching of the second- and third-year medical students at the University of Otago Medical School.

References

External links
 School of Biomedical Sciences

University of Otago
Research institutes in New Zealand